Poor Little Bitch Girl is the 27th novel by English novelist Jackie Collins. It was released on 4 October 2009 in the United Kingdom, and 9 February 2010 in the United States. The book stemmed from an idea that Collins was working on for a television series about heiresses entitled Poor Little Rich Girls. The series was ultimately never made and so she adapted the material for a novel.

References 

Novels by Jackie Collins
2009 British novels
Simon & Schuster books